Council of Southern Africa Football Associations, officially abbreviated as COSAFA, is an association of the football playing nations in Southern Africa. It is affiliated to CAF.

COSAFA organise several tournaments in the Southern African region, and its most renowned tournament is the COSAFA Cup.

Executive committee 

The 2008 annual general assembly saw the election of the new COSAFA Executive Committee. Previously the committee consisted of 14 members; the new committee now consists of seven members: the president, vice-president and five members, as well as the chief operations officer. The most recent committee was elected on 17 December 2016.

The term of office of the COSAFA President is five years and that of the Vice President is four years. The other office bearer is three years.

Member associations 

All associations that joined in 1997 were founding members of COSAFA. Comoros is the only COSAFA member to also be a member of the Union of Arab Football Associations. Réunion's governing body, Réunionese Football League, is only an associate member of COSAFA.

Competitions

COSAFA runs several competitions which cover men's, women's, youth.

Current title holders

 the championship of 2020 was cancelled due to COVID-19 pandemic.
 invited guest-nation

See also

Confederation of African Football (CAF)
Central African Football Federations' Union (UNIFFAC)
Council for East and Central Africa Football Associations (CECAFA)
Union of North African Football Federations (UNAF)
West African Football Union (WAFU)

References

External links 
COSAFA Official Website

Council of Southern Africa Football Associations